The 1991 All-Ireland Under-21 Hurling Championship was the 28th staging of the All-Ireland Under-21 Hurling Championship since its establishment by the Gaelic Athletic Association in 1964. The championship began on 12 June 1991 and ended on 8 September 1991.

Kilkenny entered the championship as the defending champions, however, they were beaten by Offaly in the Leinster final.

On 8 September 1991, Galway won the championship following a 2-17 to 1-09 defeat of Offaly in the All-Ireland final. This was their fifth All-Ireland title overall and their first title since 1986.

Limerick's Frankie Carroll was the championship's top scorer with 1-38.

Results

Leinster Under-21 Hurling Championship

Quarter-finals

Semi-finals

Final

Munster Under-21 Hurling Championship

Quarter-finals

Semi-finals

Final

Ulster Under-21 Hurling Championship

Semi-finals

Final

All-Ireland Under-21 Hurling Championship

Semi-finals

Final

Championship statistics

Top scorers

Overall

References

Under
All-Ireland Under-21 Hurling Championship